The Iles Formation is a Mesozoic geologic formation. Dinosaur remains are among the fossils that have been recovered from the formation, although none have yet been referred to a specific genus.

See also 
 List of dinosaur-bearing rock formations
 List of stratigraphic units with indeterminate dinosaur fossils

References

Bibliography 
  

Geologic formations of Colorado
Geologic formations of Wyoming
Cretaceous Colorado
Cretaceous geology of Wyoming
Campanian Stage